Alcides Risco Batista (born 29 November 1953) is a Cuban rower. He competed in the men's eight event at the 1976 Summer Olympics.

Notes

References

External links
 
 

1953 births
Living people
Cuban male rowers
Olympic rowers of Cuba
Rowers at the 1976 Summer Olympics
Place of birth missing (living people)
Pan American Games medalists in rowing
Pan American Games silver medalists for Cuba
Pan American Games bronze medalists for Cuba
Rowers at the 1975 Pan American Games
Rowers at the 1979 Pan American Games
Medalists at the 1975 Pan American Games
Medalists at the 1979 Pan American Games